Sporisorium is a fungus genus in the Ustilaginaceae family.

References

External links 

Fungal plant pathogens and diseases
Ustilaginomycotina
Taxa named by Christian Gottfried Ehrenberg